Chavarriella is a genus of moths in the family Geometridae. The genus was described by Pitkin in 1993.

Species
Chavarriella brunneilinea Prout, 1912
Chavarriella distinguenda Dognin, 1923
Chavarriella excelsa Dognin, 1910
Chavarriella fallax Warren, 1907
Chavarriella lafayaria Dognin, 1892
Chavarriella lafayaria ssp. promontoria Warren, 1904
Chavarriella lugentiscripta Prout, 1917
Chavarriella lugentiscripta ssp. dubia Prout, 1917
Chavarriella luteifimbria Dognin, 1901
Chavarriella pelops Prout, 1932
Chavarriella porcius Schaus, 1912
Chavarriella psittacina Prout, 1910
Chavarriella semiornata Warren, 1901
Chavarriella sophrosyne Prout, 1932
Chavarriella trianteris Prout, 1932
Chavarriella urania Herbulot, 1988

References

Geometrinae